Rider on a Dead Horse is a 1962 American Western film directed by Herbert L. Strock and starring John Vivyan.

Plot
Three gold prospectors bury their gold in a secret location but greed quickly reduces their number to two.

Cast
 John Vivyan as Hayden 
 Bruce Gordon as Barney Senn 
 Kevin Hagen as Jake Fry 
 Lisa Lu as Ming Kwai

References

External links
 

1962 films
1962 Western (genre) films
1960s English-language films
American Western (genre) films
Films directed by Herbert L. Strock
Allied Artists films
1960s American films